Robert Calderbank (born 28 December 1954) is a professor of Computer Science, Electrical Engineering, and Mathematics and director of the Information Initiative at Duke University.   He received a BSc from Warwick University in 1975, an MSc from Oxford in 1976, and a PhD from Caltech in 1980, all in mathematics. He joined Bell Labs in 1980, and retired from AT&T Labs in 2003 as Vice President for Research and Internet and network systems. He then went to Princeton as a professor of Electrical Engineering, Mathematics and Applied and Computational Mathematics, before moving to Duke in 2010 to become Dean of Natural Sciences.

His contributions to coding and information theory won the IEEE Information Theory Society Paper Award in 1995 and 1999.

He was elected as a member into the US National Academy of Engineering in 2005 for leadership in communications research, from advances in algebraic coding theory to signal processing for wire-line and wireless modems. He also became a fellow of the American Mathematical Society in 2012.

Calderbank won the 2013 IEEE Richard W. Hamming Medal and the 2015 Claude E. Shannon Award.

He was named a SIAM Fellow in the 2021 class of fellows, "for deep contributions to information theory".

He is married to Ingrid Daubechies.

References

External links

Dean Profile at Duke.
Faculty Profile at Princeton.
Publications on the DBLP.
Publications from the arXiv.
Publications from Google Scholar.

1954 births
Living people
American electrical engineers
20th-century American mathematicians
21st-century American mathematicians
Alumni of the University of Warwick
Alumni of the University of Oxford
California Institute of Technology alumni
Princeton University faculty
Duke University faculty
Fellows of the American Mathematical Society
Fellows of the Society for Industrial and Applied Mathematics
Members of the United States National Academy of Engineering